1973 in Korea may refer to:
1973 in North Korea
1973 in South Korea